Francisco David Sousa Franquelo (born 3 February 1980 in Málaga, Andalusia) is a Spanish former footballer who played as an attacking midfielder.

Football career
A youth graduate from Real Madrid who never made it past the B-side, Sousa played his first La Liga match for Real Valladolid (on loan from Madrid) on 31 August 2002, in a 1–0 away win against Racing de Santander. After another season with Valladolid – which now held the totality of the player's rights – which ended in relegation, he would play two further campaigns in the second division, subsequently joining Getafe CF, a team from the capital outskirts, for 2006–07's top flight.

Sousa appeared sparingly for Getafe during two-and-a-half seasons, scoring twice in a 2–4 loss at RCD Mallorca on 7 October 2007. He featured in no games whatsoever in the first part of 2008–09, which led to a January 2009 loan to Rayo Vallecano in the second level.

In late July 2009, Sousa was released by Getafe and continued in division two, moving to Albacete Balompié and being relegated in his second year. In late January 2012, aged nearly 32, he moved abroad for the first time in his career, joining several compatriots at Nea Salamis Famagusta FC in the Cypriot First Division.

References

External links

1980 births
Living people
Footballers from Málaga
Spanish footballers
Association football midfielders
La Liga players
Segunda División players
Segunda División B players
Tercera División players
Real Madrid C footballers
Real Madrid Castilla footballers
Real Valladolid players
Getafe CF footballers
Rayo Vallecano players
Albacete Balompié players
Xerez CD footballers
Cypriot First Division players
Nea Salamis Famagusta FC players
Spain youth international footballers
Spanish expatriate footballers
Expatriate footballers in Cyprus
Spanish expatriate sportspeople in Cyprus